Artin is both a surname and a given name. In the Armenian-speaking world, it is a variation of the given name Harutyun. It has also been claimed to be an old Median name meaning pure and virtuous coming from the name of the Median king Phraortes (Fravartiš). even though there is no historic documented evidence of the Median usage nor a notable person . Notable people with the name include:

People with the surname
Emil Artin (1898–1962), Austrian mathematician
Michael Artin (born 1934), American mathematician, son of Emil Artin
Murad Artin (born 1960), Swedish politician
Wendy Artin (born 1963), American painter
Yacoub Artin (1842–1919), Armenian-Egyptian educator and writer

People with the given name
Artin Boşgezenyan, an Armenian deputy for Aleppo in the first (1908–1912), second (April–August 1912) and third (1914–1918) Ottoman Parliaments of the Constitutional Era
Artin Dadyan Pasha, Armenian citizen of the Ottoman Empire and Secretary of State for Foreign Affairs from 1876 until 1901
Artin Hindoğlu, 19th-century Ottoman etymologist, interpreter, professor, linguist, and writer of the first modern French-Turkish dictionary
Artin Penik (1921–1982), Turkish-Armenian protester who committed suicide by self-immolation

See also
Artin (disambiguation)
Harutyun
Artins, a commune in the Loir-et-Cher département in central France